Ulina Tinaiadivila Sagone (born ) is a Fijian female weightlifter, competing in the 53 kg category and representing Fiji at international competitions. 

She won a gold medal at the 2013 Oceania Weightlifting Championships.
She participated at the 2014 Youth Olympic Games.
She won the bronze medal in the snatch at the 2016 Oceania Weightlifting Championships.

Major results

References

External links

http://www.the-sports.org/ulina-sagone-weightlifting-spf353460.html
http://websites.sportstg.com/assoc_page.cgi?c=2-3653-0-0-0&sID=35619&&news_task=DETAIL&articleID=24587810

1998 births
Living people
Fijian female weightlifters
Place of birth missing (living people)
Weightlifters at the 2014 Summer Youth Olympics
20th-century Fijian women
21st-century Fijian women